The 1993–94 Gonzaga Bulldogs men's basketball team represented Gonzaga University in the West Coast Conference (WCC) during the 1993–94 NCAA Division I men's basketball season. Led by twelfth-year head coach Dan Fitzgerald, the Bulldogs were  overall in the regular season (12–2 in WCC, first), and played their home games on campus at the Charlotte Y. Martin Centre in Spokane, Washington.

Regular season champion Gonzaga advanced to the semifinals of the WCC tournament at Santa Clara, but were upset by fourth seed San Diego.

Eleven days later in the National Invitation Tournament (NIT), the Bulldogs traveled south and won at Stanford. Next was at Kansas State in the second round, but the Zags lost by two points to finish at

Postseason results

|-
!colspan=6 style=| WCC Tournament

|-
!colspan=6 style=| National Invitation Tournament

References

External links
Sports Reference – Gonzaga Bulldogs men's basketball – 1993–94 season

Gonzaga Bulldogs men's basketball seasons
Gonzaga
Gonzaga
1993 in sports in Washington (state)
1994 in sports in Washington (state)